Giuseppe de Liguoro (1869–1944) was an Italian actor and film director of the silent era. He came from an aristocratic neapolitan family. De Liguoro was a pioneering figure of early Italian cinema, making a number of historical films in early 1910s such as L'Inferno (1911) and Mary Tudor (1911).

His son was the director Eugenio de Liguoro, who also occasionally acted in his father's films. His other son Wladimiro de Liguoro was also a filmmaker.

Selected filmography
 Mary Tudor (1911)
 L'Inferno (1911)
 L'Odissea (Homer's Odyssey)(1911) 
 Odette (1916)
 Farewell, My Beautiful Naples (1917)
 Iris (1918)

References

Bibliography 
 Parrill, Sue & Robison, William B. The Tudors on Film and Television. McFarland, 2013.

External links 
 

1869 births
1944 deaths
Italian male film actors
Italian male silent film actors
Italian film directors
19th-century Neapolitan people
20th-century Italian male actors